Steven Subotnick is an animation teacher and award-winning independent animator. He received a BFA in Film from UCLA. He later received an MFA in Experimental Animation from California Institute of the Arts. While at CalArts, he was mentored under Jules Engel.

He is married to animator Amy Kravitz. He has taught animation at Harvard University, the School of the Museum of Fine Arts in Boston, and currently at Rhode Island School of Design and Massachusetts College of Art and Design.

Filmography
Lake (2013)
 Baby (2012)
 Fight (2012)
 Boy (2011)
 Two (2011)
 West (2011)
 Thine (2011)
 Jelly Fishers  (2009)
Glass Crow (2004)
Hairyman (1998)
The Devil’s Book (1994)
Calling Cards (1992)
Twins (1986)
The Dancing Bulrushes (producer, 1985)
3 Nocturnes (1985)
Snow Woman (1985)

External links
www.stevensubotnick.com - official site
The Man Behind Hairyman: Interview with Steven Subtonick
RISD faculty profile:Steven Subtonick
ASIFA profile

American animators
American animated film directors
Living people
Rhode Island School of Design faculty
Harvard University faculty
Animation educators
Year of birth missing (living people)